Ligatin, otherwise known as eIF2D, is a protein that in humans is encoded by the LGTN gene. This protein is not a component of the heterotrimeric eIF2 complex, but instead functions in different pathways of eukaryotic translation.

Function 

This gene encodes a protein receptor that localizes phosphoglycoproteins within endosomes and at the cell periphery. This trafficking receptor for phosphoglycoproteins may play a role in neuroplasticity by modulating cell-cell interactions, intracellular adhesion, and protein binding at membrane surfaces. In hippocampal neurons, long-lasting down-regulation of ligation mRNA levels occurs via post-transcriptional RNA processing following glutamate receptor activation. This protein contains single PUA and SUI1 domains and these domains may function in RNA binding and translation initiation, respectively.

See also 
Eukaryotic translation
Eukaryotic initiation factor

References

Further reading